The International Championship is a professional ranking snooker tournament. The reigning champion is Judd Trump.

History 
The event was introduced in the 2012/2013 season. It was named as the "first overseas 'major'", because the tournament had the same level of ranking points as the UK Championship. With the change in the rankings system from points to prize money, the International Championship had the third highest prize fund and winner's cheque of any ranking event on the snooker calendar, behind the World and UK Championships, and the highest outside of the United Kingdom, until 2018 when the China Open had its winner's cheque raised to £225,000. The 2012 edition ran from 28 October to 4 November in Chengdu, China, and it was won by Judd Trump, who defeated Neil Robertson 10–8 in the final.

Winners

References

 
Recurring sporting events established in 2012
2012 establishments in China
Snooker ranking tournaments
Snooker competitions in China